Eagle Island may refer to:

Antarctica
 Eagle Island, Antarctica

Atlantic Ocean
 The former name of Speedwell Island, one of the Falkland Islands

Australia
 Eagle Island (Queensland)
 Eagle Island (Western Australia)

Canada
 One of the Tusket Islands in Nova Scotia

Indian Ocean
Eagle Islands, Chagos Archipelago
Rémire Island (or Eagle Island), an island in Seychelles

Ireland
 Eagle Island, County Mayo

United Kingdom
Eagle Island, County Fermanagh, a townland in County Fermanagh, Northern Ireland

United States
 Eagle Island (Alabama), see List of islands of Alabama
 Eagle Island, Alaska, near Grayling, Alaska
 Eagle Island (Casco Bay, Maine)
 Eagle Island (Penobscot Bay, Maine)
 Eagle Island (Worcester County, Maryland), see List of islands of Maryland
 Eagle Island (Massachusetts), see List of islands of Massachusetts
 Eagle Island, in Sodus Bay (Lake Ontario), New York
 Eagle Island (North Carolina), in New Hanover County, North Carolina
 Eagle Island (Pennsylvania)
 Eagle Island (Washington)
 Eagle Island (Wisconsin)
 Eagle Island Camp, New York

In fiction
 A fictional island in the 2019 animated film The Angry Birds Movie 2

See also
 Eagle Island State Park (disambiguation)